Sidi Ibrahim Cissé (born 6 February 2003) is a French professional footballer who plays as a winger for Ligue 2 club Niort.

Club career
On 10 June 2021, Cissé signed his first professional contract with Niort. He made his senior debut with Niort in a 1–0 Ligue 2 tie with Caen on 31 July 2021.

References

External links
 

2003 births
Living people
French footballers
French sportspeople of Senegalese descent
Association football wingers
Chamois Niortais F.C. players
Ligue 2 players
Championnat National 3 players